Ginger is a 2013 Indian Malayalam-language comedy road film directed by Shaji Kailas and written by Rajesh Jayaraman. It stars Jayaram, Muktha George, Mallika, Sudheesh, Jagadish, Suresh Krishna, Lakshmi Gopalaswamy and Kaviyoor Ponnamma. The film was released on 2 November 2013, coinciding with the Diwali fest.

Plot

It is set against the backdrop of a village that enroots a road trip. Two scheming thieves Vivekanandan and Najeeb Kecheri plan to rob Harinarayanan and his wife Devika's house, but in a quirk of fate, becomes a part of their life. Meanwhile, when moneylender Edamuttam Pappachen asks them to do something special for him, the story takes another turn.

Cast
 Jayaram as Vivekanandan
 Muktha George as Roopa
 Mallika as Devika
 Sudheesh as Najeeb Kecheri
 Jagadish as Sethumadhavan
 Irshad as Mohan Menon
 Suresh Krishna as Harinarayanan 
 Kailash as Venkida Krishnan (Venkidi)
 P. Balachandran as Palathara Balakrishnan
 Santhosh as S.I Ajith Kumar
 Lakshmi Gopalaswamy as Molykutty
 Kaviyoor Ponnamma as Vivekanandan's mother
 Siddique as Kuriakose
 Tini Tom as C.I Radhakrishnan
Priyanka Anoop as Shivakami
 Kalasala Babu as Elamuttam Pappachan
 Anoop Chandran as Keshavan
 Lakshmipriya as Geetha
 Thezni Khan as Sathi
 Manka Mahesh -Cameo Appearance
Sidhartha Siva-Cameo Appearance
Indrans-Cameo Appearance
Vijayaraghavan-Cameo Appearance

Critical reception
The film received mostly unfavourable reviews from critics.

References

External links
 
 Entertainment Oneindia

2013 films
2010s Malayalam-language films
Indian comedy films
Indian road movies
Indian heist films
Films shot in Thrissur
Films directed by Shaji Kailas